National Action Party may refer to:

National Action Party (El Salvador) (Partido Acción Nacional)
National Action (Chile, 1963) (Partido de Acción Nacional)

National Action Party (Mexico) (Partido Acción Nacional)
National Action Party (Nicaragua) (Partido Acción Nacional)
National Action Party (Turkey) (Milliyetçi Hareket Partisi)
National Action Party (UK)

See also
 Action Party (disambiguation)
 National Action (disambiguation)
 National Socialist Action Party, a British neo-Nazi political party in the early 1980s